Ghorbati (or Qorbati), also known as Magadi (Mogadi), Qazulagi and Jogigi, Lafzi Mugat or Arabi/Arabcha in Central Asia, refers to various argots, spoken by the Ghorbati and closely related peoples, often called “Persian Gypsies” or “Central Asian Gypsies”. There is no proof of any historical connection between any of these peripatetic groups and the Roma or Dom peoples, except for the fact that some use a few words that are apparently of Domari origin. These argots are related to Lotera’i, or Judeo-Persian.

The Ghorbati of Afghanistan is not identical to the various varieties from Iran, but they are closely related. The base is local Persian, with many words rendered incomprehensible by means of phonetical manipulation, as well as a large number of terms which are of Semitic (Aramaic and Hebrew, as well as Arabic) origin. This vocabulary originated from the Banu Sassan and Sufis, and is quite widespread throughout the Islamic world. 

The name of Magati, another secret language, is cognate with “Mogadi/Magadi”, the alternate name for Ghorbati, and is also related to the ethnonym of the Mugat people, known as Lyuli in Central Asia and Jogi in Afghanistan. This language from Qaisar, near Faryab, Afghanistan, bears some similarities with Adurgari, the argot of the Sheikh Muhammadi community, as well as the Abdal (Teber) in Turkey, and Gurbetça in Cyprus.

References

Sources 
 
 Tracing a Gypsy Mixed Language through Medieval and Early Modern Arabic and Persian Literature

Romani in Iran
Romani in Afghanistan
Para-Romani
Languages of Iran